Highway 62, also known as High Level Road, is a  spur located in northern British Columbia, running from the junction of the Yellowhead Highway (Highway 16) in New Hazelton to downtown Hazelton. Highway 62 is an unofficial highway.

After leaving New Hazelton, the highway crosses the Hagwilget First Nations reserve community. Continuing west, Highway 62 passes over the Bulkley River and through the village of Two Mile before ending on River Road in Hazelton.

References

62